Mahapurana (महापुराण) or Trishashthilkshana Mahapurana is a major Jain text composed largely by Acharya Jinasena during the rule of Rashtrakuta ruler Amoghavarsha and completed by his pupil Gunabhadra in the 9th century CE. Mahapurana consists of two parts. The first part is Ādi purāṇa written by Acharya Jinasena in Sanskrit. The second part is Uttarapurana which is the section composed by Gunabhadra in Apabhraṃśa.

Description
The Trishashthilkshana Mahapurana was composed by Jinasena, Gunabhadra and Chavundaraya in 9th century CE.

Mahapurana consists of two parts. The first part is Ādi purāṇa written by Acharya Jinasena. The second part is Uttarpurana which is the section composed by Gunabhadra. Adipurana contains about 37 chapters where as Uttarapurana contains about 65 chapters.
The completed and edited text was released by Lokasena, pupil of Gunabhadra in a celebration at Bankapura in the court of Vira-Bankeyarasa in 898 CE. The first 42 Parvans of this text were written by Jinasena, while remaining 
34 Parvans were composed by Gunabhara.

This text gives an encyclopedic account of the Jain tradition. The text is widely quoted. A widely used quote in Carl Sagan's Cosmos, written in the Mahapurana (Chap 4, verses 16-31, 38-40 ) is:

"Some foolish men declare that a Creator made the world. The doctrine that the world was created is ill-advised, and should be rejected. If God created the world, where was He before creation? . . .How could God have made the world without any raw material? If you say He made this first, and then the world, you are faced with an endless regression . . . Know that the world is uncreated, as time itself is, without beginning and end. And it is
based on the principles . . . - The Mahapurana (The Great Legend), Jinasena (India, ninth century)",Afterword on Jinasena, D. Lakey, The Philosophical Forum, Volume 33 Issue 3 Page 343-344 - Fall 2002

A number of Jain and non-Jain texts have been influenced by the Mahapurana. Mahapurana was the model for Saiva Siddhanta Periyapuranam which gives biographies of the 63 individuals.

See also 
Jainism
Tirthankara
Jinasena

Notes

References
 
 

Jain texts
Indigenous Aryanism